Cyprus competed at the 1988 Summer Paralympics in Seoul, South Korea. 6 competitors from Cyprus won no medals and so did not place in the medal table.

See also 
 Cyprus at the Paralympics
 Cyprus at the 1988 Summer Olympics

References 

Cyprus at the Paralympics
Nations at the 1988 Summer Paralympics
1988 in Cypriot sport